is Japanese dish and prepared of immature soybeans in the pod. The pods are boiled or steamed and may be served with salt or other condiments. The dish has become popular across the world due to their rich nutrition, and because of health concerns. When the beans are outside the pod, the term mukimame is also sometimes used in Japanese.
Edamame are a common side dish in washoku and as an appetizer to alcoholic beverages such as beer or shōchū. As an ingredient Edamame are found in both sweet and savory dishes such as takikomi gohan, tempura, and zunda-mochi.

Name

In Japan, the name edamame is commonly used to refer to the dish. It literally means "stem beans" (枝 eda = "branch" or "stem" + 豆 mame = "bean"), because the beans were often sold while still attached to the stem.

In China and Taiwan, maodou is used commonly to refer to the dish, which literally means "fur peas" (毛 mao = "fur" + 豆 dou = "bean").

History
Soybeans were first cultivated in China some 7000 years ago, while the earliest documented reference to the term "edamame" dates from the year 1275, when the Japanese monk Nichiren wrote a note thanking a parishioner for the gift of "edamame" he had left at the temple. 
In 1406, during the Ming dynasty in China, the leaves of the soybeans were eaten and during outbreaks of famine, it was recommended that citizens eat the beans whole or use them ground up and added to flour. Centuries later in China 1620 they are referred to again, but as maodou, which translates to the term "hairy bean". They are found in the records of the Runan vegetable gardens and stated as having a medicinal purpose, as well as being a snack food. Edamame appeared in haikai verse in Japanese in the Edo period (1603–1868), with one example as early as 1638.

They were first recognized in the United States in 1855, when a farmer commented on the difficulties he had shelling them after harvest. In March 1923, the immature soybean is first referred to in text in the United States in the book "The Soybean" by C. V. Piper and Joseph W. Morse. In this book, they are first pictured and shown as being eaten out of open shell pods. The first nutritional facts about them are published and some recipes are included, as they were a new type of vegetable to the public. The earliest recorded usage in English of the word edamame is in 1951 in the journal Folklore Studies. Edamame appeared as a new term in the Oxford English Dictionary in 2003 and in the Merriam-Webster dictionary in 2008.

In 2008, the first soybeans grown in Europe were sold in grocery stores as edamame and eaten as an alternative source of protein.

Preparation

Harvesting
Edamame is typically harvested by hand to avoid damaging the crop's stems and leaves. Green soybean pods are picked before they fully ripen, typically 35 to 40 days after the crop first flowers. Soybeans harvested at this stage are sweeter because they contain more sucrose than soybeans picked later in the growing season. Other factors contributing to edamame's flavor include free amino acids such as glutamic acid, aspartic acid, and alanine. Often these unbound amino acids decrease as the pods fully expand and ripen.

Cooking
Pods may be boiled in water, steamed, or microwaved. The ends of the pod are sometimes cut before boiling or steaming. The most common preparations use salt for taste, either dissolved in the boiling water before introducing the soybean pods or added after cooking. 

Edamame is a popular side dish at Japanese izakaya restaurants with local varieties being in demand, depending on the season. Salt and garlic are typical condiments for edamame. In Japan, a coarse salt wet with brine is  preferred on beans eaten directly from the pod.

Storage
Edamame purchased fresh is preferably eaten the same day, with flavor degradation being noticeable in as few as 10 hours after harvest. However, fresh edamame will stay edible for three days when stored in the refrigerator. Damaged pods brown more rapidly however, mainly due to the enzyme polyphenol oxidase. If stored fresh, the pods should be kept humid to prevent discoloration and wilting. This can be accomplished by wrapping the pods in plastic or another material which traps moisture.

Freezing fresh edamame is another option for maintaining good quality over a few months. Fresh edamame should be blanched first before being frozen.

Eating 
Edamame can come in two forms: pods or beans. Edamame beans are easy to eat and can be cooked just like any other type of beans. The edamame pods require using the teeth or fingers to slide the edamame beans into the mouth, after which the pods (or shells) are discarded. Eating them with chopsticks has been characterized as requiring some skill.

Nutrition
The United States Department of Agriculture states that edamame beans are a "soybean that can be eaten fresh and are best known as a snack with a nutritional punch". Frozen, prepared edamame beans are 73% water, 12% protein, 9% carbohydrates, and 5% fat. A 100-gram reference serving of edamame provides  of food energy, and rich amounts (20% or more the Daily Value, DV) of protein, dietary fiber, and micronutrients, particularly folate (78% DV), manganese (49% DV), and vitamin K (26% DV) (table). The fat content in edamame supplies 361 mg of omega-3 fatty acids and 1794 mg of omega-6 fatty acids.

References

External links 

 The Soybean Piper, C. V. (Charles Vancouver)., Morse, W. Joseph. (1923). New York: McGraw-Hill Book Company, Inc.

East Asian vegetables
Hawaiian cuisine
Korean vegetables
Pod vegetables
Soy-based foods
Vegetarian dishes of China
Vegetarian dishes of Japan